Kuwait's third district consists of 15 residential areas.

Areas of the Third District

Kaifan
Rawda
Adailiya
Jabriya
Surra
Khaldiya
Qurtuba
Yarmouk
Abraq Khaitan
New Khaitan (South Khaitan)
Salam
Siddiq
Hittin
Shuhada
Zahra

References
The areas are officially stated by Ministry of Interior circular. (The numbering above is also by the Ministry of Interior)

Politics of Kuwait
Electoral districts of Kuwait